New Orleans is a 1947 American musical romance film starring Arturo de Córdova and Dorothy Patrick, and directed by Arthur Lubin.  Though it features a rather conventional plot, the film is noteworthy both for casting jazz legends Billie Holiday as a singing maid romantically involved with bandleader Louis Armstrong, and extensive playing of New Orleans-style Dixieland jazz: over twenty songs (or versions of songs) are featured in whole or part.

Armstrong's band contains a virtual Who's Who of classic jazz greats, including trombonist Kid Ory, drummer Zutty Singleton, clarinetist Barney Bigard, guitar player Bud Scott, bassist George "Red" Callender, pianist Charlie Beal, and pianist Meade Lux Lewis. Also performing in the film is cornetist Mutt Carey and bandleader Woody Herman.

New Orleans is Holiday's only feature film appearance.

 Plot 
A Storyville casino owner and a high society opera singer fall in love during the birth of the blues in New Orleans.

 Cast 
Arturo de Córdova as Nick Duquesne
Dorothy Patrick as Miralee Smith
Marjorie Lord as Grace Voiselle
Irene Rich as Mrs. Rutledge Smith
John Alexander as Col. McArdle
Richard Hageman as Henry Ferber
Jack Lambert as Biff Lewis
Bert Conway as Tommy Lake
Joan Blair as Constance Vigil
John Canady
Louis Armstrong
Billie Holiday as Endie
Woody Herman and His Orchestra
Zutty Singleton on drums
Barney Bigard on clarinet
Kid Ory on trombone
Bud Scott on guitar
Red Callender on bass
Charlie Beal on piano
Meade Lux Lewis on piano
Mutt Carey on trumpet
Shelley Winters as Miss Holmbright (Nick's New York secretary; uncredited)

 Production New Orleans has its origins in an abandoned component of an unfinished RKO Pictures feature film by Orson Welles — "The Story of Jazz" segment of It's All True. A history of jazz alternatively titled "Jam Session", the section of the film was being written by Elliot Paul in 1941 under contract to Welles. The story of Louis Armstrong was to have been central to that segment of It's All True.

An additional connection to Welles is that several members of the film's Original New Orleans Ragtime Band — Kid Ory, Mutt Carey, Bud Scott, Barney Bigard and Zutty Singleton — had first been brought together in 1944, for his CBS Radio series, The Orson Welles Almanac.New Orleans is the only feature film made by singer Billie Holiday, and the last film in which writer-producer Herbert J. Biberman was involved before he was blacklisted.

Producer Jules Levey wanted to make a film about the history of jazz. Lubin signed to direct in July 1946.

Levey's associate was Herbert Biberman who said "we're not archaeologists. We're trying to be accurate with dates and places, if not names – and still turn out an entertaining picture."

In July 1946 Arthur Lubin was scouting for locations in New Orleans. He hoped to feature Lena Horne, Duke Ellington and other black musicians. Ten days of location filming started on 28 August and cost $110,000. The National Jazz Foundation collaborated with Lubin during filming.

De Cordova was borrowed from Eagle-Lion Films in August. Dorothy Patrick was borrowed from MGM. Levey was so pleased with the performances of Patrick and de Cordova he wanted to reteam them in a film called Monterey to celebrate California's 100th anniversary, though the picture was never made.

 Reception 
A 2019 review in Diabolique magazine stated, "it’s one of those movies where critics generally go “the music’s great but everything else is terrible and isn’t Hollywood racist” which is basically true – but it was 1947, what did people expect? At least there is a lot of music, Louis Armstrong and Dorothy Patrick are charming, it’s fascinating to see Holliday in a movie and I love how in the story her character marries Armstrong’s. Also Lubin seems to have genuine affection for the characters and the music – it’s much better than his previous three features."

 Home media 
 2000: Kino Lorber Home Video, Region 1 DVD, April 25, 2000

 Soundtrack 
Although most of the music created for New Orleans'' was truncated in the film's release version, a soundtrack issued in 1983 made the full versions of the songs available, with additional music cut from the final release. Songs include "Do You Know What It Means to Miss New Orleans?"

Tracklist 
Per AFI, the tracklist is:
 A1		Flee As A Bird / When The Saints Go Marching In
 A2		West End Blues
 A3		Do You Know What It Means To Miss New Orleans?
 A4		Brahms' Lullaby
 A5		Tiger Rag
 A6		Buddy Bolden Blues Take #3
 A7		Buddy Bolden Blues Take #4
 A8		Basin St. Blues
 A9		Raymond St. Blues
 A10		Milenberg Joys
 A11		Where The Blues Were Born In New Orleans
 A12		Farewell To Storyville
 B1		Beale Street Stomp
 B2		Dippermouth Blues (Slow Version)
 B3		Dippermouth Blues (Fast Version)
 B4		Shimme-Sha-Wabble
 B5		Ballin' The Jack
 B6		King Porter Stomp
 B7		Mahogany Hall Stomp (Slow Version)
 B8		Mahogany Hall Stomp (Fast Version)
 B9		The Blues Are Brewin'
 B10		Endie
 B11		Do You Know What It Means To Miss New Orleans?

References

External links 

New Orleans at Letterbox DVD
Complete film at Internet Archive

1947 films
1940s romantic musical films
1940s English-language films
American black-and-white films
Films shot in New Orleans
Films directed by Arthur Lubin
Films set in New Orleans
Louis Armstrong
Billie Holiday
American romantic musical films
1940s American films